Serkovo is a rural locality (a village) in Styopantsevskoye Rural Settlement, Vyaznikovsky District, Vladimir Oblast, Russia. The population was 22 as of 2010.

Geography 
The village is located 10 km south-east from Styopantsevo, 34 km south-west from Vyazniki.

References 

Rural localities in Vyaznikovsky District